Mildred is an unincorporated community in Taney County, in the Ozarks of southern Missouri. Mildred is located on Missouri Route 76, south of Forsyth and east of Kirbyville.

History
A post office called Mildred was established in 1910, and remained in operation until 1934. An early postmaster gave the community the name of his daughter, Mildred Price.

References

Unincorporated communities in Taney County, Missouri
Unincorporated communities in Missouri